These are statistics for the first season of the Suomensarja held in 1937.

Overview
The 1937 Suomensarja  was contested by 13 teams divided into 2 regional sections. The top teams from each section then participated in a promotion play-offs with KPT Kuopio and VPS Vaasa eventually gaining promotion with the former finishing as champions.

League tables

Itäsarja (Eastern League)

Länsisarja (Western League)

Nousukarsinnat (Promotion Playoffs)

KPT Kuopio were promoted and VPS Vaasa were required to undertake a further round of playoffs.

Mestaruussarja/Suomensarja promotion/relegation playoffs

VPS Vaasa were promoted to the Mestaruussarja and VIFK Vaasa relegated.

See also
Mestaruussarja (Tier 1)

References

Suomensarja
2
Fin
Fin